The Kromme Waal is a street in Amsterdam between the Prins Hendrikkade and the Oude Waal. 
From Kraansluis (bridge 300, in the Prins Hendrikkade) to Waalseilandbrug (bridge 283), the street forms the western quay of the Waalseilandsgracht, the old inner harbor of Amsterdam between the Montelbaanstoren and the IJ.

Trivia 

The architect Bernard Bijvoet (1889-1979) was born here.
A photo of a tugboat in the Kromme Waal adorns the cover of The Beach Boys' album Holland (1973).

Notes

Sources

Streets in Amsterdam